With or Without You is a live CD/DVD U2 tribute album recorded by the Dutch band Kane.  The DVD was filmed on September 20, 2000 at Plan C in Rotterdam.  The CD was recorded a day later at Paridiso, Amsterdam.  The album was released in December 2000, but only in the Netherlands.

Track listing 
The CD and DVD contained an almost identical track list, the only  difference being that the DVD contained one extra song.  Songs from five U2 albums were covered.  It is noteworthy that the performance of "Acrobat" is the only official live recording of the song currently available, as it was only performed live by U2 on their Experience + Innocence Tour in 2018, for which there is currently no officially released recording.

References

External links
Kane homepage

U2 tribute albums
2000 live albums
2000 video albums
Live video albums
Kane (Dutch band) albums
Sony BMG live albums